This is a list of diplomatic missions of Antigua and Barbuda. Antigua and Barbuda's diplomatic network does not extend to any neighbouring Caribbean countries. Its embassy and mission to the European Union in Brussels and its embassy in Morocco is shared with other East Caribbean states.

Africa
 
 Rabat (Embassy)

Americas

 Toronto (Consulate-General)

 Havana (Embassy)

 Washington, D.C. (Embassy)
 Miami (Consulate-General)
 New York City (Consulate-General)

Asia

 Amman (Embassy)

 Beirut (Embassy) 
 
 Dubai (Economic Office)

Europe

 Brussels (Embassy)

 Athens (Embassy)

 Madrid (Embassy)

 London (High Commission)

Multilateral organisations
 
New York (Permanent Mission)

Gallery

See also
 Foreign relations of Antigua and Barbuda
 List of diplomatic missions in Antigua and Barbuda

References

External links 
 
 Government of Antigua and Barbuda
 Embassy of Antigua and Barbuda in Madrid - His Excellency Dr. Dario Item is the Head of Mission.
 Honorary Consulate General of Antigua and Barbuda in the Principality of Monaco
 Antigua & Barbuda Official Business Hub

Diplomatic missions
Antigua and Barbuda